Galaxie is a Francophone indie garage rock band formed in 2002 in Montreal, Quebec, Canada. Formerly known as Galaxie 500, they should not be confused with the American alternative rock band Galaxie 500.

History
Under their original name, the band released two albums, Galaxie 500 (2002) and Le Temps au point mort (2006), on the C4 Records label.

Following the release of Le Temps au Point Mort, Galaxie 500 was nominated for the Group of the Year award in the 10th annual MIMI (Montreal International Music Initiative) awards.

The lineup that recorded Galaxie 500 consisted of Olivier Langevin (guitar and vocals), Pierre Girard (guitar), Fred Fortin (guitar and vocals), Simon Gauthier (bass), and Michel Dufour (drums).

Several changes in personnel occurred between the recording of the two albums. For Le Temps au point mort, Langevin was joined by returning members Girard (guitar) and Fortin (drums), and by Vincent Peake (bass) of Groovy Aardvark (1986–2005) and François Lafontaine (keyboards) of Karkwa.

Under its current name, the band released its third album, Tigre et diesel, in 2011. The album was subsequently named a shortlisted nominee for the 2011 Polaris Music Prize.

Members

Current
Fred Fortin (2002–present)
Olivier Langevin (2002–present)
Daniel Thouin (2011–present)
Pierre Fortin (2007–present)

Former
Pierre Girard (2002–2009)
Vincent Peake (2005–2009)
François Lafontaine (2005-2009)
Michel Dufour (2002-????)
Simon Gauthier (2002-????)

Discography

Albums
Galaxie 500 (2002)
Le Temps au point mort (2006)
Tigre et diesel (2011)
Zulu (2015)
Super Lynx Deluxe (2018)

See also

Music of Canada
Music of Quebec
Canadian rock
List of Canadian musicians
List of bands from Canada
:Category:Canadian musical groups

References

External links
Galaxie

Musical groups established in 2002
Canadian indie rock groups
Musical groups from Montreal
2002 establishments in Quebec